Julius Bruck (October 6, 1840 – April 20, 1902) was a German dentist who was a native of Breslau.

He studied dentistry and medicine at the Universities of Breslau, Berlin, Bonn and Paris; obtaining a degree in dentistry from Berlin in 1858. Afterwards he worked as an assistant to his father, Jonas Bruck (1813-1883) in Breslau. In 1871 he became privat-docent at the University of Breslau, and in 1891 was awarded with an honorary professorship.

In 1867 Bruck designed a water-cooled diaphanoscopic instrument for translumination of the bladder via the rectum. This instrument consisted of an illuminated platinum thread inserted into a double glass wall cylinder with the instrument's outer glass chamber cooled by water.

Selected publications 
 Die Krankheiten des Zahnfleisches (Diseases of the gums)
 Beiträge zur Pathologie und Histologie der Zahnpulpa (Contributions to the pathology and histology of the dental pulp)
 Ueber Angeborene und Erworbene Defekte des Gesichts und des Kiefers (Regarding congenital and acquired defects of the face and jaw)
 Das Urethroscop und Stomatoscop Durch Galvanisches Glühlicht (The urethroscope and stomatoscope by galvanic incandescent light)

References 
 Julius Bruck biography @ Jewish Encyclopedia
 The Boston Medical and Surgical Journal by Massachusetts Medical Society
 Thoracoscopy: Origins Revisited by Florin V. Moisiuc & Henri G. Colt

External links
 

German dentists
1840 births
1902 deaths
People in health professions from Wrocław
People from the Province of Silesia
University of Paris alumni
German expatriates in France
19th-century dentists